Kjellbjørg Lunde (born 26 November 1944 in Naustdal) is a Norwegian politician for the Socialist Left Party.

Career
She was elected to the Norwegian Parliament from Hordaland in 1981, and was re-elected on three occasions.

Lunde was a member of Stord municipality council in the periods 1975–1979 and 1979–1981.

References

1944 births
Living people
Socialist Left Party (Norway) politicians
Members of the Storting
People from Naustdal
20th-century Norwegian politicians